Liandu District is the central urban district of the prefecture-level city of Lishui in Zhejiang Province, China. It was formerly Lishui County then Lishui county-level city and then Lishui prefecture-level city

Administrative divisions
Subdistricts:
Zijin Subdistrict (紫金街道), Yanquan Subdistrict (岩泉街道), Wanxiang Subdistrict (万象街道), Baiyun Subdistrict (白云街道), Shuige Subdistrict (水阁街道), Fuling Subdistrict (富岭街道)

Towns:
Bihu (碧湖镇), Liancheng (联城镇), Dagangtou (大港头镇), Shuangxi (双溪镇), Laozhu She Ethnic Town (老竹畲族镇)

Townships:
Taiping Township (太平乡), Xiandu Township (仙渡乡), Fengyuan Township (峰源乡), Gaoxi Township (高溪乡), Shuanghuang Township (双黄乡), Huangcun Township (黄村乡), Lixin She Ethnic Township (丽新畲族乡)

References

Districts of Zhejiang
Lishui